Vladimir Zaripzyanovich Shestakov (born January 30, 1961) is a Russian judoka who competed for the Soviet Union in the 1988 Summer Olympics.

In 1988 he won the silver medal in the middleweight class.

External links
profile

1961 births
Living people
Russian male judoka
Soviet male judoka
Olympic judoka of the Soviet Union
Judoka at the 1988 Summer Olympics
Olympic silver medalists for the Soviet Union
Olympic medalists in judo
Medalists at the 1988 Summer Olympics
Goodwill Games medalists in judo
Competitors at the 1986 Goodwill Games